RTK class III is a class of receptor tyrosine kinases.

It includes PDGFRα, PDGFRβ, C-KIT, CSF1R, and FLT3.

References

Tyrosine kinase receptors